The Grand Wash Cliffs extend south-southeast from the Grand Canyon-Parashant National Monument in northwest Arizona west of the Shivwits Plateau south through the Grand Cliffs Wilderness and into the Lake Mead Recreation Area. The Grand Wash Cliffs cross the Grand Canyon where the Colorado River enters Lake Mead.  To the south of the Grand Canyon the Grand Wash Cliffs continue past the east side of Grapevine Mesa and then southeast above and east of the Hualapai Valley forming the southwest margin of the Music Mountains.

List of landforms/communities along Grand Wash Cliffs
(form north-to-south)
 Grand Wash Cliffs Wilderness (~north terminus) (Loc. dot 1)
 Squaw Canyon
 Pigeon Canyon
 Pearce Canyon
 Pearce Ferry, Lake Mead (at Colorado River)
 Meadview, Arizona (Grapevine Mesa, west, at foothills) (Loc. dot 2)
 Garnet Mountain (Loc. dot 3)
 Music Mountains (part of Hualapai Plateau elevations, east)
 Crozier, Arizona
 Valentine, Arizona (at south terminus) (Loc. dot 4)
 Peacock Mountains
 Cane Springs, Arizona (using Upper Burro Creek Wilderness coord.) (Loc. dot 5)

See also

 Hurricane Cliffs
 Aubrey Cliffs
 Aubrey Valley

References

 GNIS data for Grand Wash Cliffs
 GNIS data for Upper Grand Wash Cliffs
 GNIS data for Grand Wash Cliffs Wilderness

External links
 Grand Wash Cliffs Wilderness, AZ at topoquest.com
 Coordinates for Upper Burro Creek Wilderness, for (Cane Springs, Arizona)

Grand Wash Cliffs Wilderness
 Grand Wash Cliffs Wilderness at wilderness.net

Geology/Geography
 Geologic Map of the Peacock Mountains and Southern Grand Wash Cliffs, map Citation 
 Grand Wash Basin (north Grand Wash Cliffs), maps & description, for water resources, etc.
 Geology strata (photo & graphic) of Grand Wash Cliffs, at Geologic History of the Lake Mead National Recreation Area, at 3dpark.wr.usgs.gov 

Geology of Arizona
Cliffs of Arizona
Landforms of Mohave County, Arizona